Sex-O Olympic-O is the fifth album by the Revolting Cocks, released on March 3, 2009 through 13th Planet Records. The song "Wizard of Sextown" is featured in the 2008 horror film Saw V.

Track listing

Personnel

RevCo
Josh Bradford - lead and background vocals
Alien Jourgensen - production, drum programming, guitars (2), horn arrangements, keyboards (2), harmonica (3), programming, background vocals (1, 2, 7, 12)
Sin Quirin - guitars (1, 3-12), bass (1, 3–8, 11, 12), keyboards
Clayton Worbeck - keyboards, programming, mixing, bass (9)

Additional personnel
Paul Raven - bass (2, 10)
Isa Martinez - additional Spanish vocals (4)
John Bilberry - engineer, drum programming
Dave Donnelly - mastering
Lawton Outlaw - art director, design & layout
Allan Amato - model photography
Bridget Blonde - cover model

References

2009 albums
Revolting Cocks albums
Albums produced by Al Jourgensen